Gutang Township is an rural township in Lianyuan, Hunan Province, People's Republic of China.

Administrative division
The township is divided into 24 villages, the following areas: Gutang Village, Liangyuan Village, Shenjia Village, Xiaojia Village, Tangbian Village, Tangbian Village, Chexi Village, Qunshan Village, Dingjia Village, Shanfeng Village, Shatuo Village, Zhaojia Village, Poshi Village, Wangyan Village, Xin Village, Maitang Village, Dawanli Village, Pingling Village, Luoshan Village, Niubu Village, Chitang Village, Zhulian Village, Fuxin Village, Fengmu Village, and Dahushan Village (古塘村、良院村、申家村、肖家村、塘边村、车溪村、群山村、丁家村、杉凤村、砂托村、赵家村、破石村、望岩村、新村、麦塘村、大湾里村、坪岭村、落山村、牛埠村、池塘村、竹联村、复新村、枫木村、大虎山村).

See also
Phoenix School for Girls

External links

Divisions of Lianyuan